Marco Chiudinelli (born 10 September 1981) is a retired tennis player from Switzerland. A member of Switzerland's winning 2014 Davis Cup squad, he reached his highest singles ranking of 52 in February 2010 during a career that was often hindered by injury.

Biography
Marco grew up in Münchenstein and learned to play tennis at Basel Lawn Tennis Club. He later joined a region-wide tennis group, where he first met Roger Federer, who belonged to the nearby Old Boys Tennis Club. They quickly became friends but were soon the 'black sheep' of the group, with one or the other often forced to sit on the sidelines for disciplinary reasons.

In 1993 he finished as runner-up to Federer at the Swiss 12-and-under indoor championship in Lucerne. As a teenager he moved to Biel to further his tennis education, joining Federer and the older Yves Allegro, who were then staying in an apartment together, and the trio spent many hours playing video games when not practicing tennis. In 2001, at the suggestion of Allegro, Chiudinelli moved to Halle in Germany to train.

Career

Early career, 2000–2005
Marco Chiudinelli played his first professional matches in 2000, but did not compete on a regular basis until 2002. That year he won his first tournament on the third-tier Futures circuit in Dubai, defeating a 16-year-old Jimmy Wang in the final. He finished as runner-up to Grégory Carraz at a Futures event in Poitiers in March and secured a second Futures title at Syros in April.

Over the following months he tried unsuccessfully to qualify for the main draw of the Gerry Weber Open in Halle, the Mercedes-Benz Cup in Los Angeles, and the Canada Masters in Toronto. He also attempted to qualify for the 2002 US Open, winning against a fading Cédric Pioline in the first round – this was technically a win by retirement, as Pioline stormed off court while 0-5 down in the third set. He lost in the next round of qualifying to Argentine Gastón Etlis. He spent the bulk of the 2003 season playing on the Challenger Tour and reached the semi-final stage of events in Fergana and, after coming through qualifying, Nottingham, where he lost to second seed John Van Lottum.

Chiudinelli began 2004 well, winning 18 of his first 22 matches. He won another Futures title in January in Doha and the following month reached his first Challenger final in Belgrade – along the way defeating a teenage Novak Djokovic in one of his earliest professional appearances. He won his first main draw match on the ATP Tour at the 2004 Gerry Weber Open, overcoming compatriot Michel Kratochvil in straight sets, but lost in the next round to Jiří Novák. In September he took his first Challenger title in Donetsk and came through qualifying at the 2004 AIG Japan Open in Tokyo in October, eventually reaching the round of 16 after upset victories over the higher ranked Alexander Peya and Dennis van Scheppingen. At the 2004 Swiss Indoors, his hometown tournament, Chiudinelli defeated Albert Montañés in the first round, and lost his next match to Rainer Schüttler. He finished the season ranked 142 in the world and having earned $97,936 in prize money, which was more than twice as high as the previous two seasons combined.

Chiudinelli's ranking reached a then high of 129 in January 2005 after making the round of 16 at the Qatar Open. He soon received his first call up to the Switzerland Davis Cup team for the tie versus the Netherlands, losing in five sets to the more established Sjeng Schalken, and later winning the dead rubber against Peter Wessels. After retiring through injury in his second round match against Michael Ryderstedt at Wimbledon Qualifying in June, Chiudinelli was later forced to get surgery to heal persistent pain in his shoulder. As a consequence he did not play for the remainder of the season and his ranking fell to 287.

2006–2008
Chiudinelli initially struggled to recover his ranking during the first half of 2006 and had fallen to 775 in the world by the start of May. That same month he won 10 straight matches to take successive Futures titles in Kuwait. After coming through qualifying at the Gerry Weber Open, Chiudinelli defeated Christophe Rochus in the main draw, before falling to the seeded Kristof Vliegen in the second round – the ranking points from this event moving him back up to 359.

In July Chiudinelli enjoyed some success in doubles with partner Jean-Claude Scherrer, the pair finishing as runners-up at the Suisse Open in Gstaad. At the 2006 US Open as a qualifier, he defeated Fernando Vicente and Feliciano López in his first two matches. He then fell to 25th seed Richard Gasquet in four sets, though the points accumulated from this event ensured he broke back into the top 200. Following the US Open, Chiudinelli won the dead rubber against Serbia's Janko Tipsarević at the 2006 Davis Cup World Group Play-offs and made the semi-final of the Mons Challenger in October. He experienced a disappointing first round defeat to 5th seed David Ferrer at the 2006 Swiss Indoors, having taken the first set in a tiebreak. He ended the season at 155 in the world, with earnings of $114,646 in singles.

He played less during the 2007 and 2008 tennis seasons, owing to persistent injury problems.

2009–2014

Chuidinelli entered the 2009 PTT Thailand Open, again as qualifier, and defeated German qualifier Florian Mayer in the first round and followed that up with a second-round win over former world No. 1 Marat Safin. He lost in a three-set match to top seed Jo-Wilfried Tsonga in the quarterfinals.

He reached the semifinals in Basel, his hometown tournament by beating eighth seed Philipp Kohlschreiber, and his countryman, qualifier Michael Lammer. He also defeated Richard Gasquet before losing to compatriot and world No. 1 Roger Federer in the semifinals.

Chiudinelli qualified for the main draw of the 2010 Australian Open and reached the second round, taking a set off world No. 3, Novak Djokovic. Two weeks later as a result of his play in 2009, he was awarded Comeback Player of the Year in the 2009 ATP World Tour Awards.

At the 2010 French Open, Chiudinelli was accepted into the main draw by direct entry and beat Somdev Devvarman to advance to the second round for the first time. There he lost to American John Isner in a match that extended over two days because of rain.

Later career, 2015–2017

He also played the longest doubles match ever with Stanislas Wawrinka, being defeated by Lukáš Rosol and Tomáš Berdych of the Czech Republic in the first round of the 2013 Davis Cup. The match, played on 2 February 2013, lasted 7 hours, 2 minutes.

Chiudinelli again represented Switzerland in the 2014 Davis Cup World Group first round, partnering Michael Lammer. His doubles victory with Lammer clinched the first-round victory over Serbia, allowing Switzerland to advance to the quarterfinals for the first time since 2004. Switzerland went on to win its first Davis Cup in history.

At the 2014 Gerry Weber Open in Halle, Chiudinelli played doubles with childhood friend and Roger Federer. They reached the final and held championship points, but lost a close tiebreaker.

In 2016, Chiudinelli qualified for the US Open and beat fellow qualifier Guilherme Clezar in the first round in four sets. This was Chiudinelli's first main-draw Grand Slam tournament victory since the 2010 US Open. In the second round, he faced Lucas Pouille. Chiudinelli was two sets and a break up in the third set and was serving for the match at 5–4, but was broken. He then lost the resulting tiebreaker and could not regain his form in the last two sets.

Chiudinelli then received a wild card into the 2016 Swiss Indoors tournament where he took on compatriot Stan Wawrinka in the first round and lost in three sets 7–6(7–1), 1–6, 4–6, despite leading the match against the newly crowned 2016 US Open champion.

In 2017, after an injury plagued-season, Chiudinelli announced on his website that he would be retiring following the 2017 Swiss Indoors tournament where he enjoyed the greatest success of his career, reaching the semifinals in 2009.

ATP career finals

Doubles: 4 (1 title, 3 runner-ups)

ATP Challenger Tour & ITF Futures

Singles: 15 (10 titles, 5 runner-ups)

Doubles: 17 (6 titles, 11 runner-ups)

Singles performance timeline

National participation

Davis Cup (9 wins, 19 losses)

   indicates the result of the Davis Cup match followed by the score, date, place of event, the zonal classification and its phase, and the court surface.

Wins: 1

References

External links
 Official website 
 
 
 

1981 births
Living people
Sportspeople from Basel-Stadt
Münchenstein
Swiss male tennis players
Swiss-Italian people